Mônica Rodrigues (born September 20, 1967 in Rio de Janeiro) is a Brazilian female volleyball player. She won the silver medal in the inaugural women's beach volleyball tournament at the 1996 Summer Olympics, partnering Adriana Samuel. She plays for the FIVB, a volleyball association. She has played for eleven years, and has collected eleven titles.

References

External links
 
 

1967 births
Living people
Brazilian women's beach volleyball players
Olympic beach volleyball players of Brazil
Olympic silver medalists for Brazil
Olympic medalists in beach volleyball
Beach volleyball players at the 1996 Summer Olympics
Volleyball players from Rio de Janeiro (city)
Portuguese people of Brazilian descent
Medalists at the 1996 Summer Olympics
Competitors at the 1994 Goodwill Games
Goodwill Games medalists in beach volleyball
20th-century Brazilian women